A cross-plot is a scatter plot used primarily in Earth science and social science to describe a specialized chart that compares multiple measurements made at a single time or location along two or more axes. The axes of the plot are commonly linear, but may also be logarithmic.

Cross-plots are used to interpret geophysical (e.g., amplitude versus offset analysis), geochemical, and hydrologic data.

References

Plots (graphics)
Geological techniques